Christian Reitz (born 29 April 1987) is a German 25 metre rapid fire pistol shooter, the current world record holder.

Career
He rose to fame during 2005, the first year with the new equipment rules, but was defeated in that year's European Junior Championships by teammate Philipp Wagenitz before finishing his junior career with victories in the 2006 ISSF World Shooting Championships and the 2007 European Championships.

In his first year as a senior, Reitz won two World Cup competitions and was the runner-up behind three-time Olympic champion Ralf Schumann at another, equalling the world record with a 591 score in Milan, and raising Schumann's final world record from 790.0 to 794.0. At the 2008 Olympics, he won the bronze medal behind Oleksandr Petriv and Schumann.

Performance timeline

25 metre rapid fire pistol

Records

References

External links
 
 
 

1987 births
Living people
People from Löbau
German male sport shooters
ISSF pistol shooters
World record holders in shooting
Shooters at the 2008 Summer Olympics
Shooters at the 2012 Summer Olympics
Shooters at the 2016 Summer Olympics
Shooters at the 2020 Summer Olympics
Olympic shooters of Germany
Olympic gold medalists for Germany
Olympic bronze medalists for Germany
Olympic medalists in shooting
Medalists at the 2008 Summer Olympics
Medalists at the 2012 Summer Olympics
Shooters at the 2015 European Games
European Games gold medalists for Germany
European Games medalists in shooting
Shooters at the 2019 European Games
European Games silver medalists for Germany
European Games bronze medalists for Germany
Sportspeople from Saxony